Cameron Gill (born 7 April 1998) is a Scottish professional footballer who plays as a goalkeeper for Arbroath. Gill previously spent 13 years Dunfermline Athletic, is in his second spell with Arbroath and also previously played for Cowdenbeath.

Early and personal life
Gill attended Gracemount High School in Edinburgh.

Club career
Gill began his career with Edinburgh South Boys Club, joining Dunfermline Athletic at under-11 level. In January 2017 he signed a new contract with the club, following links to clubs including Scottish Premiership sides Celtic and Heart of Midlothian, and later that month he moved on loan to Arbroath. Upon his return to Dunfermline he stated his intention to break into the first team.

Following the departure of Hutton at the end of the 2016–17 season, Gill became Dunfermline's second-choice goalkeeper for the 2017–18 season. He made his senior debut on 2 September 2017, coming on as a second-half substitute in a Scottish Challenge Cup match with Buckie Thistle, with the youngster keeping a clean sheet in 30 minutes he was on the field of play. Gill made his first full start for Dunfermline on 28 July 2018, in a Scottish League Cup match at East End Park against Stirling Albion.

Gill failed to make any sort of sustained breakthrough with Dunfermline, appearing just 19 times for the side before his release in May 2021. Shortly after leaving the club he signed with Fife rivals Cowdenbeath.

In May 2022 he re-signed for Arbroath.

International career
After previously playing for the Scotland under-16 team, he was called up by the Scotland under-20 team in November 2018.

Career statistics

References

1998 births
Living people
Scottish footballers
Dunfermline Athletic F.C. players
Arbroath F.C. players
Cowdenbeath F.C. players
Association football goalkeepers
Scotland youth international footballers
Scottish Professional Football League players